Mario Božić (born 25 May 1983) is a Bosnian retired footballer who played as a central midfielder.

At international level, Božić made two appearances for Bosnia and Herzegovina between 2007 and 2008.

Club career
Born in Tuzla, Božić moved to Serbia at an early age and started his senior career with Loznica. He also played for Radnički Stobex and Beograd, before moving to Hungarian club Fehérvár in the summer of 2004. As a regular member of the first team, Božić helped them win the 2005–06 Magyar Kupa. He also made over 100 appearances for the club in all competitions. In the 2008 winter transfer window, Božić was transferred to Újpest. He spent a total of five years in the country, amassing 126 league appearances and scoring 15 goals.

In the summer of 2009, Božić moved to Slovakia and signed with Slovan Bratislava. He spent two seasons in the country and won four major trophies with the club.

In June 2011, Božić signed with Israeli club Ashdod, but failed to make any appearance for the club. He returned to Serbia in the 2012 winter transfer window and surprisingly signed with Borac Čačak. However, after only a few weeks, Božić left the club without making his debut and moved to Chinese side Shanghai Shenhua.

In August 2012, Božić joined Azerbaijani club Simurq, becoming the club's top scorer with six goals in the 2012–13 season.

Božić ended his career by playing with FK Loznica in Serbian second league.

International career
In March 2007, Božić received his first call-up for the Bosnia and Herzegovina national team. He made his international debut on 8 September 2007, coming on as a substitute for Darko Maletić in a 0–1 loss to Hungary. His second and final international was an August 2008 friendly match against Bulgaria.

Post-playing career
On 9 February 2017, Božić was appointed director of football at Loznica.

Statistics

Honours
Fehérvár
 Magyar Kupa: 2005–06

Slovan Bratislava
 Slovak Super Liga: 2010–11
 Slovak Cup: 2009–10, 2010–11
 Slovak Super Cup: 2009

References

External links

 
 

1983 births
Living people
Sportspeople from Tuzla
Serbs of Bosnia and Herzegovina
Association football midfielders
Bosnia and Herzegovina footballers
Bosnia and Herzegovina international footballers
FK Loznica players
FK Radnički Klupci players
FK Beograd players
Fehérvár FC players
Újpest FC players
ŠK Slovan Bratislava players
F.C. Ashdod players
Shanghai Shenhua F.C. players
Simurq PIK players
Panachaiki F.C. players
FK Voždovac players
FK Borac Čačak players
Second League of Serbia and Montenegro players
Nemzeti Bajnokság I players
Slovak Super Liga players
Chinese Super League players
Azerbaijan Premier League players
Football League (Greece) players
Serbian SuperLiga players
Serbian First League players
Bosnia and Herzegovina expatriate footballers
Expatriate footballers in Azerbaijan
Bosnia and Herzegovina expatriate sportspeople in Azerbaijan
Expatriate footballers in China
Bosnia and Herzegovina expatriate sportspeople in China
Expatriate footballers in Greece
Bosnia and Herzegovina expatriate sportspeople in Greece
Expatriate footballers in Hungary
Bosnia and Herzegovina expatriate sportspeople in Hungary
Expatriate footballers in Israel
Bosnia and Herzegovina expatriate sportspeople in Israel
Expatriate footballers in Slovakia
Bosnia and Herzegovina expatriate sportspeople in Slovakia